Dewan Bahadur Sir Raghupathi Venkataratnam Naidu (1 October 1862 – 26 May 1939) was an Indian social reformer who hailed from Machilipatnam in Andhra Pradesh in India. His father Appayya Nayadu worked as a subedar in Madras Army. Their forefathers served as commanders in Madras Army and East Indian Company Army since its inception i.e. late 17th Century. He was a disciple of Veeresalingam, and has been described as "the most powerful orator of his day".

Social Reforms
Raghupathi Venkataratnam Naidu was born on 1 October 1862 in Machilipatnam in a famous Telaga Naidu family. As his father, Raghupathi Appayyanaidu worked as Subedar in the army, he lived in Chandrapur. This helped him gain knowledge of Hindi, Urdu, Persian languages. He continued his education in Nizam high school in Hyderabad when his father was transferred there. He later graduated from Madras Christian College. He continued further education to complete M.A. and L.T. from University of Madras.

He founded the Social Purity Association in 1891 to train people as honest citizens.

He worked for the eradication of untouchability and upliftment of Harijans, and founded an orphanage and a hostel for Harijan boys and girls in Kakinada.

He strived for the abolition of the "Devadasi system" (the system in which women were devoted to the temples and who in the course of time were treated like prostitutes) in Andhra, and succeeded to a considerable extent.

He promoted widow remarriages and encouraged women's education.

He was an ardent Brahmo and promoted the Brahmo movement in Andhra. The Brahmo Samaj honored him with the title of "Brahmarshi".

All the above social reforms have led to him being described as the second great social reformer of Andhra, the first being Veeresalingam.

He was one of the trio of Brahmo Samaj. The other two being Kandukuri Veeresalingam Panthulu and Desiraju Peda Bapayya.

Educational Achievements

After passing Matriculation at Hyderabad, he took his B.A., degree from Madras Christian College and MA. and L.T. degrees from Madras University.

Joining the teaching line, he worked as the Principal of the Mehboob College, Secunderabad between 1889 and 1904, and then of the Pitapuram Raja College, Kakinada between 1905 and 1919. In 1925 he became the first elected vice chancellor of Madras University, holding that position until 1928. He was conferred a knighthood by the British government in 1924.

Author
His thoughts and writings were published in 1924 authored by him and V. Ramkrishna Rao -  The Message and Ministrations of Dewan Bahadur Sir R. Venkata Ratnam, Volume 3 by Sir R Venkata Ratnam, V. Ramakrishna Rao

References

Brahmos
Telugu poets
Telugu writers
1862 births
1939 deaths
Indian social reformers
Vice Chancellors of the University of Madras
English-language writers from India
Dewan Bahadurs
Knights Bachelor
Indian Knights Bachelor
People from British India
People from Krishna district
Writers from Andhra Pradesh
19th-century Indian essayists
20th-century Indian essayists
19th-century Indian educational theorists
20th-century Indian educational theorists
Scholars from Andhra Pradesh
People from Machilipatnam